Patrice Simon (born 1969) is a French chemist in the field of materials science and electrochemistry. He is currently a Distinguished Professor at the Université Paul Sabatier since 2007. His research activities are focused onto the modification of the material/electrolyte interfaces in electrodes for electrochemical energy storage devices such as supercapacitors and batteries. He is also former Director of the European Research Institute "ALISTORE ERI", and currently deputy director of the French Newtwork on Electrochemical Energy Storage (RS2E).

Biography
Simon studied at École Nationale Supérieure des Ingénieurs en Arts Chimiques et Technologiques (ENSIACET) in Toulouse, graduating with M.S. in Metallurgy (1992) and Ph.D. in Materials science (1996). Thereafter he worked as Assistant Professor of Electrochemistry at the Conservatoire National des Arts et Métiers in Paris, and from 2001 at the CIRIMAT laboratory of materials science, Université Paul Sabatier, Toulouse. He received his D.Sc. from Université Paul Sabatier in 2002 and was appointed full Professor of Materials Sciences at CIRIMAT in 2007. He was promoted as Distinguished Professor in 2014.

Awards and honours
2020 : member de l'European Academy Of Sciences (Europe)
2019: Member of Académie des Sciences
2019: Honorary professorship in Beijing University of Chemical Technology
2019: Highly Cited Researcher 2019
2019: Member of Academia Europaea
2019: Grand Prix Pierre Süe
2018: Member of the French Academy of Technologies
2018: Clarivate Citation Laureates
2018: Highly Cited Researcher 2018 
2018: Brian Conway Award of the International Society of Electrochemistry
2017: Senior Member of the Institut Universitaire de France
2016: Fellow of the International Society of Electrochemistry
2016: Highly Cited Researcher 2016 
2016: Lee Hsun Lecture Award on Materials Science, Chinese Academy of Science
2016: Fellow of the International Society of Electrochemistry
2015: Silver Medal of the CNRS
2015: RUSNANOPRIZE Prize on Nanotechnologies
2015: Charles Eichner Medal from French Materials and Metallurgy Society (SF2M)
2012: European Research Council Advanced Grant
2012: Excellence Chair of the Airbus group Fondation
2009: Tajima Prize of the International Society of Electrochemistry
2007: Junior Member of the Institut Universitaire de France

References

Living people
Electrochemists
French metallurgists
French physical chemists
French materials scientists
21st-century French scientists
21st-century French engineers
1969 births
Members of the French Academy of Sciences